The Sri Lanka cricket team toured England in the 2002 season to play a three-match Test series against England, followed by a triangular One Day International tournament that also featured India. Sri Lanka finished in third place in the ODI tournament, while England won the Test series 2–0 with one match drawn.

Tour matches

First-class: Kent vs Sri Lankans

List A: Sir Paul Getty's XI vs Sri Lankans

First-class: British Universities vs Sri Lankans

First-class: Durham vs Sri Lankans

First-class: Middlesex vs Sri Lankans

First-class: Glamorgan vs Sri Lankans

First-class: Marylebone Cricket Club vs Sri Lankans

List A: West Indies A vs Sri Lankans

List A: Somerset vs Sri Lankans

List A: Gloucestershire v Sri Lankans

List A: Northamptonshire v Sri Lankans

Test series

1st Test

2nd Test

3rd Test

NatWest Series (ODI)

1st Match: England v Sri Lanka

3rd Match: India v Sri Lanka

4th Match: England v Sri Lanka

6th Match: India v Sri Lanka

7th Match: England v Sri Lanka

9th Match: India v Sri Lanka

External sources
 CricketArchive
 CricInfo

References
 Playfair Cricket Annual 2003
 Wisden Cricketers' Almanack 2003

2002
International cricket competitions in 2002
2002 in English cricket
2002 in Sri Lankan cricket